Zijdewind (West Frisian: Sidewind) is a village in the Dutch province of North Holland. It is a part of the municipality of Hollands Kroon, and lies about 8 km north of Heerhugowaard.

The village was first mentioned in 1421 as Nuwe Nyedorper Zydwijnde, and means "sidewards located dike". Zijdewind started as a peat excavation village. In 1652, a church was built, but was decommissioned. It was used as a farm and often mockingly called the cow church. In 1970, it was demolished to make way for a roundabout.

The statistical area "Zijdewind", which also can include the surrounding countryside, has a population of around 310.

References

Populated places in North Holland
Hollands Kroon